is a Japanese track and field athlete specialising in the high hurdles. He won a bronze medal at the 2018 World U20 Championships. He later also won a bronze medal at the 2019 Summer Universiade.

His personal best in the 110 metres hurdles is 13.06 (+1.2 m/s) set in Osaka in 2021, NR.

International competitions

References

2000 births
Living people
Japanese male hurdlers
Universiade bronze medalists for Japan
Universiade medalists in athletics (track and field)
Medalists at the 2019 Summer Universiade
Athletes (track and field) at the 2020 Summer Olympics
Olympic athletes of Japan
21st-century Japanese people